Tanya Louise Woodward (born 7 October 1970; née Groves) is a former English badminton international player and a former national champion.

Biography 
Woodward represented Sussex at the national tournament and became an English national champion after winning the English National Badminton Championships women's singles title in 1996.

She was part of the English junior team that won the silver medal at the 1989 European Junior Championships in Manchester.

Achievements

IBF International 
Women's singles

Women's doubles

Mixed doubles

References 

1970 births
Living people
Sportspeople from Worthing
English female badminton players